Samantha Louise Job  is a British civil servant who is Director for Defence and International Security at the Foreign, Commonwealth and Development Office. She was appointed to the Order of St Michael and St George in the 2022 New Year Honours.

Early life and education 
Job has said that she wanted to enter diplomatic service from the age of 14. Her mother and father had served in the Royal Air Force, and she was interested in a career that tried to stop wars. She was an undergraduate student at the University of Oxford. She was based at Christ Church, and matriculated in 1988.

Career 
In 1992, Job started work in the Foreign, Commonwealth and Development Office (FCO). She originally worked as an officer, focussing on geographic issues in Southeast Asia and the Middle East. She covered issues such as nuclear proliferation, international security and the Iran nuclear deal. Job was posted to New York City to work at the United Kingdom Mission to the United Nations, and later to Washington at the rank of Counsellor.

During her early career, Job experienced sexism, being told by the Ambassador to Tunis that her career would “never last ... it's no career for a woman,”. In 2013 she was appointed Head of the North Africa Department at the FCO. Three years into her role she appointed the first woman Ambassador to Tunis.

Job is on the advisory board of Women In International Security UK. She was appointed Companion of the Order of St Michael and St George (CMG) in the 2022 New Year Honours for services to British foreign policy.

Personal life 
Job has two daughters.

References 

Living people
Alumni of Christ Church, Oxford
Members of HM Diplomatic Service
Companions of the Order of St Michael and St George
Members of the Royal Victorian Order
People educated at Caistor Grammar School
Year of birth missing (living people)
Women civil servants
20th-century British diplomats